Tribal Rage is a real-time strategy game developed by Disintegrator for Microsoft Windows, released in 1998. It was published by TalonSoft in the USA and by Empire Interactive in Europe. The game was met with low to mediocre reviews.

Plot
The game is set in California, Earth in the year 2030. War, famine and plague have forced the populace into six different tribes, each fighting for control of the post-apocalyptic wastelands that remain.

Gameplay
The game features six playable tribes:
 Bikers
 Cyborgs
 Enforcers
 Amazons
 Death Cultists
 Trailer Trash

It is also possible for the player to design their own warriors, scenarios and vehicles using the in-game editor.

Like many RTS games, players use the mouse to play and interact with the game. Keyboard hotkeys can also be used to aid in performing actions. Players must construct their base and collect resources in order to fund the creation of units, which are then used in battle. The object of the game is to defeat the opposition by destroying their base and units.

See also 
 KKND
 KKND2: Krossfire
 Command & Conquer

References

External links

1998 video games
Post-apocalyptic video games
Real-time strategy video games
Video games developed in the United States
Video games set in California
Windows games
Windows-only games
Empire Interactive games
TalonSoft games
Multiplayer and single-player video games